Aleksandras Abišala (born 28 December 1955 in Inta, Russian SFSR) is a former Lithuanian politician and Prime Minister of Lithuania (1992).

Abišala was born on 28 December 1955 into a family of deportees in the Komi region of the Russian Soviet Federative Socialist Republic (RSFSR).

He became one of the leaders of the Kaunas faction of the Sąjūdis movement in 1988. Abišala was elected deputy to the Lithuanian Supreme Soviet in 1990 and was one of the signatories of the 11 March declaration of independence. Until 1992, he served as minister without portfolio, then from 21 July through 2 December 1992 as prime minister.

In 2007, he established his own business consulting company called "A. Abišala and Partners".

References

External links 
A. Abišala in official website of Seimas

1955 births
Living people
Lithuanian consultants
Prime Ministers of Lithuania
People from Inta
Signatories of the Act of the Re-Establishment of the State of Lithuania